Ihr wolltet Spass (German for "You wanted fun") is the third full-length studio album by the German industrial rock/medieval metal band Tanzwut. It was released in 2004 by PICA Music in a digipak. The album shows Tanzwut's sound gravitating towards a more industrial metal sound.

Track listing
 "Wieder da" − 3:47
 "Nein nein" − 3:13
 "Der Traum" − 3:58
 "Meer" − 4:52 (Samples by Jonathan Janssen)
 "Zaubern" − 4:10
 "Für immer" − 4:28
 "Fatue" − 3:42
 "Erdbeerrot" − 3:53
 "Ihr wolltet Spass" − 3:42
 "Der Fluch" − 4:36
 "Gnade" − 4:01
 "Caupona" − 4:47

Credits

Band
 Teufel − bagpipes, lead vocals
 Wim − bass, bagpipes, backing vocals, tromba marina
 Castus − bagpipes, shawm, tromba marina, backing vocals
 Koll − bagpipes, shawm, tromba marina, backing vocals
 Patrick − guitar, backing vocals, bagpipes, tromba marina
 Norri − percussion, keyboards

Production
 Produced, recorded and mixed by Thommy Hein at Thommy Hein Tonstudios (Berlin, Germany) and assisted by S. Friedrich
 Mastered by Tanzwut and Thommy Hein.

Music and lyrics
 Track 1 and 6: music and lyrics by Themann
 Track 2, 3 and 9–11: music and lyrics by Tanzwut and Themann
 Track 5: music by Tanzwut, lyrics by Tanzwut and Themann
 Track 4 and 8: music and lyrics by Tanzwut
 Track 7: music by Tanzwut, lyrics by Hildegard Von Bingen and Carmina Burana
 Track 12: music by Tanzwut, lyrics from Carmina Burana 76, 1/13

2004 albums
Tanzwut albums